WFTZ (101.5 FM "Rooster 101.5") is a radio station broadcasting a hot adult contemporary format. Licensed to Manchester, Tennessee, United States, it serves Coffee County and surrounding counties. It first began broadcasting in 1992. The station is currently owned by Peter Bowman's Bowman Broadcasting, LLC.

History
WFTZ began operation in November 1992 as a 3,000 watt FM station with offices located in Manchester and a tower located between Manchester and Tullahoma.

On December 5, 2016 WFTZ shifted their format from adult contemporary (branded as "Fantasy Radio") to hot adult contemporary, branded as "Rooster 101.5". A signal increase to 5,700 watts accompanied the format change – along with the programming and music selection being taken in-house.

Programming
Rooster 101.5 offers a variety of local programming to its listeners.

It is currently the home of the Megan in the Afternoons, Jay & the Morning Brew, Pop Crush Nights, 
and the Every Day Joe Show.

The Rooster 101.5 studio is currently located in Tullahoma, Tennessee.

References

External links
Rooster 101.5's Website
Manchester Area Chamber of Commerce's Website

Coffee County, Tennessee
Mainstream adult contemporary radio stations in the United States
Radio stations established in 1993
FTZ
1993 establishments in Tennessee